Overweg is a surname. Notable people with the surname include:

Adolf Overweg (1822–1852), German geologist, astronomer, and traveler
Marty Overweg, American politician and businessman
Niels Overweg (born 1948), Dutch footballer and manager